This is a list of Wikipedia articles about for-profit companies with notable commercial activities related to bitcoin. Common services are cryptocurrency wallet providers, bitcoin exchanges, payment service providers and venture capital.  Other services include mining pools, cloud mining, peer-to-peer lending, exchange-traded funds, over-the-counter trading, gambling, micropayments, affiliates and prediction markets.

Notes

References

Bitcoin